Chamshan and Charasa is a village in the Leh district of Ladakh, India. It is located in the Nubra tehsil. The road to Chamshen valley is very accessible all throughout the season while Charasa, having closest village to Chamshen because of the river in between still need to take a long way from Koyak Bridge by stretching approximately 40km more.

Demographics
According to the 2011 census of India, Chamshan Charasa has 180 households. The effective literacy rate (i.e. the literacy rate of population excluding children aged 6 and below) is 56.8%.

References 

Villages in Nubra tehsil